In mathematics, Shintani's unit theorem introduced by  is a refinement of Dirichlet's unit theorem and states that a subgroup of finite index of the totally positive units of a number field has a fundamental domain given by a rational polyhedric cone in the Minkowski space of the field .

References

External links
 Mathematical pictures by Paul Gunnells

Theorems in algebraic number theory